NGC 282 is an elliptical galaxy in the constellation Pisces. It was discovered on October 13, 1879 by Édouard Stephan.

References

External links
 

0282
18791013
Pisces (constellation)
Elliptical galaxies
Discoveries by Édouard Stephan
+05-03-015
003090